The South Berkeley Community Church is a historic church at 1802 Fairview Street in Berkeley, California.  It was added to the National Register of Historic Places in 2007.

It was designed by architect Hugo W. Storch in a Mission/Spanish Revival style to serve as the Park Congregational Church.  It was built in 1943.

References

Churches in California
Churches on the National Register of Historic Places in California
Mission Revival architecture in California
Churches completed in 1943
Buildings and structures in Berkeley, California
National Register of Historic Places in Berkeley, California
Congregational churches in California